Cecilia Panato (born 16 January 2002) is an Italian female canoeist who won six medals at senior level at the Wildwater Canoeing World Championships.

Her father is the canoeing legend Vladi Panato, also her sister Alice is a canoeist, he is also their coach.

Achievements

References

External links
 

2002 births
Living people
Italian female canoeists
Sportspeople from Verona